Kuttravali is a 1989 Indian Tamil-language crime film directed by Raja, starring Raghuvaran, Rekha and Charan Raj . It is a remake of the 1988 Hindi film Kaal Chakra. The film was released on 26 January 1989.

Plot

Cast 
Raghuvaran
Rekha
Charan Raj
Nizhalgal Ravi
Madhuri

Soundtrack 
The soundtrack was composed by Chandrabose.

Release and reception 
Kuttravali was released on 26 January 1989. The Indian Express wrote, "Kuttravali has all to do with murder (preferably on rainy nights), molestation (ditto) and mayhem, spiced with songs. A few good points linger".

References

External links 
 

1980s Tamil-language films
1989 crime films
1989 films
Films directed by L. Raja
Films scored by Chandrabose (composer)
Indian crime films
Tamil remakes of Hindi films